The Honourable Saviour Friday Udoh  (born June 5, 1957 in Akwa Ibom State, Colony and Protectorate of Nigeria) is a Nigerian legislator. Udoh was elected to the National Assembly in 2007. He is a member of the Peoples Democratic Party

Personal
Udoh is married. He is a legal practitioner.

References

External links
Official website

1957 births
Living people
Members of the House of Representatives (Nigeria)
People from Akwa Ibom State
Peoples Democratic Party members of the House of Representatives (Nigeria)